Urophora volkovae is a species of tephritid or fruit flies in the genus Urophora of the family Tephritidae.

Distribution
Kazakhstan, Uzbekistan.

References

Urophora
Insects described in 1985
Diptera of Asia